Made in Heaven is a 1987 American fantasy comedy film directed by Alan Rudolph, script from Bruce A. Evans and Raynold Gideon, and produced by Lorimar Productions. The film stars Timothy Hutton and Kelly McGillis and has cameos by Tom Petty, Ric Ocasek, Ellen Barkin and Neil Young. Emmett, a chain-smoking male angel, was played by Debra Winger (Hutton's then wife), but the character was only credited as being played by "Himself."

The original music score was composed by Mark Isham. The film was marketed with the tagline "How in Heaven did they meet? How on Earth will they find each other?"

Made in Heaven concerns two souls who cross paths in Heaven and then attempt to reconnect once they are reborn on Earth.

In 1988, the film was released on VHS format as well as digital stereo LaserDisc format. In 2009, the film made its DVD debut as part of the Warner Archive Collection.

Plot
In a small Pennsylvania town in 1957, Mike Shea (Hutton) dreams of escaping small-town life and moving to California with his girlfriend Brenda Carlucci. But Brenda leaves him with his motor running and Mike takes off alone.

On the way to California, Mike rescues a woman and her children from their car which went into a river but he perishes. Finding himself in Heaven, his Aunt Lisa greets him, and explains the rules and regulations. While searching for someone he used to know, Mike comes across heavenly guide Annie Packert (McGillis), and instantly they fall in love.

Unlike Mike, Annie has not yet lived on Earth, so their love is abruptly interrupted, just as they are going to perform a wedding ceremony. As she has not yet earned her wings on Earth, she must leave on a tour of duty and put in time inhabiting a human body.

Mike is beside himself with despair, but the heavenly powers, in the form of Emmett Humbird, chain-smoking and sporting an orange crew-cut, offer him a deal. Mike can return to Earth, with the stipulation that neither he nor Annie will remember each other. He then has 30 years in which they must find each other again.

Ally, the reincarnation of Annie, names her imaginary friend Mike. She grows up, gets married and writes a book whose protagonist is Mike. Her husband leaves her, and she is disconnected for a time. She dreams and daydreams of Mike, which confuses her, as she's not met him yet in this life.

Mike is reborn as Elmo, at 28 Emmett visits him because he is pretty much a lost soul. Just conned by a woman, he's wandering down the road. Later, he gets a copy of Ally's book.

Mike ends up meeting his original parents while hitchhiking, they are kind to him and buy him a trumpet. As a result, Elmo starts his musical career and ends up writing a hit song that he had been working on in Heaven. The song was "We Never Danced", a very ‘80s sounding song and one of the last words Annie spoke to Mike in heaven.

Mike/Elmo ends up finding Ally/Annie on the street at the end of the film, and their eyes lock on one another. It's his 30th birthday, they met in the nick of time.

Cast

Soundtrack
Made in Heaven: Original Motion Picture Soundtrack was released through Elektra Records on LP and cassette, but not on CD.

 Martha Davis (of The Motels) - "We Never Danced" (Neil Young) (also available on The Motels' compilation album Anthologyland (2001))
 R.E.M. - "Romance" (Bill Berry, Peter Buck, Mike Mills, Michael Stipe) (also available on the compilation album Eponymous (1988))
 Ric Ocasek - "I Still Want You" (Ric Ocasek)
 Luther Vandross - "There's Only You" (Luther Vandross) (an early demo version is available on the compilation album Love, Luther (2007))
 The Nylons - "Up the Ladder to the Roof" (Frank Wilson, Vincent DiMirco) (from the album One Size Fits All (1982))
 Buffalo Springfield - "Mr. Soul" (Neil Young) (from the album Buffalo Springfield Again (1967))
 Buffalo Springfield - "I Am a Child" (Neil Young) (from the album Last Time Around (1968))
 Mark Isham - "Same Time, Another Place"
 Mark Isham - "Beyond the Frames"
 Mark Isham - "Instead of Floating"

Pre-recorded songs from the film that were not on the soundtrack album:
 Sly and the Family Stone - "If You Want Me to Stay" (Sly Stone)
 Buffalo Springfield - "For What It's Worth" (Stephen Stills)
 Alberta Hunter - "Long May We Love" (Grace Freed, Roc Hillman)
 Hank Williams - "Why Should We Try Anymore" (Hank Williams)
 Ernest Tubb and Red Foley - "Goodnight, Irene" (Lead Belly)

Reception
The film was not a box office success, grossing a little over $4.5 million against a budget of $13 million.

The film's critical reception was mixed. Made in Heaven holds a 56% rating on Rotten Tomatoes based on sixteen reviews.

See also
 List of films about angels

References

External links
 
 
 
 

1987 films
1980s fantasy comedy films
1987 independent films
1987 romantic comedy films
1980s romantic fantasy films
American fantasy comedy films
American independent films
American romantic comedy films
American romantic fantasy films
1980s English-language films
Films about reincarnation
Films directed by Alan Rudolph
Films scored by Mark Isham
Films shot in Georgia (U.S. state)
Films shot in South Carolina
Films set in 1957
Films set in 1987
Films about the afterlife
1980s American films